The Volvo B7R is a coach chassis available with a range of bodies. It is promoted as a rear engined lightweight coach chassis. It is primarily intended for tourist and long-distance duties. B7R is also manufactured in China, Brazil, Hungary, India and Iran for use in regional transport services.

B7R is powered by the Volvo D7E (previously D7A, D7B and D7C) six-cylinder diesel engine with a turbocharger and intercooler. The D7E engine produces 290 hp with 1200 Nm of torque between 1050 and 1650 r/min.

It comes with a retarder incorporated into the gearbox. The retarder slows down the engine when brakes are applied. Once the engine slows down, disk brakes take over and bring the vehicle to complete stop, almost in an instant.

Its frame is a robust steel construction with a flat upper face. A flat upper face simplifies building bus body. It could be built with a maximum length of about 12.5 metres.

The B7R is also available as complete buses - the Volvo 7350 (for Mexico), Volvo 9400 (for India) and Volvo 8700. The B7R is the most widely used deluxe long-distance bus in India and is employed by not only the state-owned transport corporations of the state of Karnataka, Maharashtra, Rajasthan, Bihar and Andhra Pradesh but also by private operators.

Volvo also developed a low-floor variant of B7R, known as the Volvo B7RLE, for intercity and city operations.

In Brazil, the B7R is produced in Curitiba, since 1998. The first B7R in the country was imported from Sweden and operated in Curitiba's public transportation as a Direct Line Bus. In 2012, B7R was renamed to B290R (B7RLE was renamed to B290RLE), and is often used in BRS and BRT applications.

Uruguay also was a user of the B7R with three of the Montevidean urban and suburban bus operators buying units to bodywork in multiple companies, the first of these acquisitions were done by UCOT in 2001 with these 48 units being bodied at Busscar with the Busscar Urbanuss Pluss model. UCOT also bought 9 units more in 2007 for its recently innagurated suburban and interdepartamental branch created in January, with the fusion with another operator named CUTU that were bodyworked by Comil in the Comil Campione Vision 3.25. In 2004 the cooperatove COETC adquired 5 B7R chassis bodied at Marcopolo with the Gran Viale body, before buying 10 more in 2005, these being the first to include an LED electronic destination sign of Montevideo, another 10 B7R were bought in 2008 after the fusion of COETC and CODET(fromm Las Piedras, Uruguay, Canelones) realized August 1, 2007, these chassis were bodied at Marcopolo in the Torino VIP Class body with them starting services December 15, another batch was bought in 2010 (this one of circa 70 units) to body at Mascarello in the Gran Via II body with 36 of them being assigned to suburban lines and the rest to urban lines, an additional unit arrived as gift from Volvo bodied with a Marcopolo Gran Viale BRT body that had to be reworked to standard design by COETC, the other one being a B7RLE chassis bodied with Marcopolo Gran Viale LE body that arrived as a test unit before being bought by COETC. The last Montevidean bus operator to buy B7R chassis was Raincoop that bought 8 chassis with Marcopolo Allegro G6 bodywork in late 2007 before buying 9 more to bodywork at Caio with Foz Super body in 2008 for suburban use presented the day March 26, with 4 of the 8 chassis with Marcopolo Allegro G6 bodywork being bought by UCOT after Raincoop bankruptcy with the another 4 Marcopolo Allegro G6 and the 9 Caio Foz Super being either sold to particulars, non-Montevideo operators or scrapped; beyond Montevideo multiple operators bought this chassos with 10 units with Busscar El Buss 340 bodywork arriving for suburrban use for Tala-Pando-Montevideo and a unknow amount of units of this chassis being adquiered by "interdepartamental" operators like CITA SA(Comil Campione Vision 3.25 and Marcopolo Idealle 770 bodywork), Grupo Carminatti(composed of Carminatti Turismo and CUT Corporación,with Marcopolo Viaggio G7 1050 bodywork), Cromin/"Rutas del Sol" (Marcopolo Viaggio G6 1050 bodywork),etc with many of these units being retired because old age and stress damage

In the Philippines, B7R is also the basis for the GDW6127HKC and DMMW DM16 (included a Volvo 9800-styled front fascia) manufactured by Autodelta Coach Builders Inc and Del Monte Motor Works. It is similar to the low-end version, also the B7RLE.

Meanwhile, in Indonesia, the Volvo B7R was only offered from 2003 to 2004. But there are many bus companies that use the Volvo B7R, such as PO. Harapan Jaya, PO. Nusantara, etc. In the operation, this bus was sometimes used as the regular route and sometimes used as a tourist bus. Using the Volvo D7E, this bus has large horsepower, compared with standard Indonesian busses in the rear-engined busses, such as Hino RK8JSKA, Hino RG1JS/JN, Mercedes Benz OH 1521, and Mercedes Benz OH 1525. But due to its large power and high maintenance, many companies that were using the B7R sold the bus or changed the D7E engine into a Mitsubishi Fuso 6D16 engine or Nissan Diesel FE6B or Hino J08E to reducing operational and maintenance cost.

See also 

 List of buses

External links
Product description in Volvo website

B07R
Vehicles introduced in 1997
Bus chassis
Coaches (bus)
Single-deck buses